In the Netherlands, the  award is an honourable mention awarded by either the jury of the Gouden Griffel and Zilveren Griffel awards (for Dutch-language children's literature) or the jury of the Gouden Penseel and Zilveren Penseel awards (for illustrations in children's literature). Starting in 2022, instead of Flags and Pennants, Bronze Griffels and Bronze Brushes will be awarded. The name change is intended to underscore the purpose of these awards: to highlight the best children's books.

Writing 

The  award can be given by the jury of the Gouden Griffel and Zilveren Griffel awards.

1980 

 Lloyd Alexander, 
 Henk Barnard, 
 Gunilla Bergström, 
 Christina Björk and Lena Anderson, 
 Miep Diekmann, 
 Anne Fine, 
 Herbert Friedrich, 
 Peter van Gestel, 
 Ota Hofman, 
 Diet Huber, 
 Janosch, 
 Yasuko Kimura, 
 Leonie Kooiker, 
 Guus Kuijer, 
 Liesbeth van Lennep, 
 Carl-Anders Norrlid, 
 Gudrun Pausewang, 
 K.M. Peyton, 
 Mario Puzo, 
 Ernest Raboff, 
 Simone Schell and Thé Tjong-Khing, 
 Midred D. Taylor, 
 Oscar Wilde,

1981 

 Leif Esper Andersen, 
 Nina Bawden, 
 Thea Beckman, 
 Burny Bos and Dagmar Stam, 
 Mies Bouhuys and others, 
 Gerard Brands, 
 Helma Fehrmann and Peter Weismann, 
 Corrie Hafkamp, 
 Janosch, 
 Nannie Kuiper, 
 Guus Kuijer, 
 Frick Lennart, 
 Mildred Myrick, 
 K.M. Peyton, 
 Käthe Recheis, 
 An Rutgers van der Loeff, 
 Alet Schouten, 
 Craig Strete, 
 Kerstin Thorvall, 
 Adela Turin and Anna Curti, 
 Henri Van Daele, 
 Liva Willems and Huis Pieters,

1982 

 Christina Björk and Lena Anderson, 
 Laura Conti, 
 Philippe Dumas, 
 Karel Eykman and Peter van Straaten, 
 Renato Ferraro, 
 Peter van Gestel and Peter van Straaten, 
 Felice Holman, 
 Hugh Lewin and Lisa Kopper,  (entire series)
 Arnold Lobel, 
 Arnold Lobel, 
 Arnold Lobel, 
 Norma Fox Mazer, 
 Norma Fox Mazer, 
 Jan Ormerod, 
 Ferdinand Oyono, 
 Helen Oxenbury, 
 Margret Rettich, 
 Alet Schouten and Lidia Postma, 
 Jenny Thorne, 
 Dolf Verroen and Thé Tjong-Khing, 
 Ida Vos,

1983 

 Bernard Ashley, 
 Malcolm Bosse, 
 Victor Canning, 
 Robert Cormier, 
 Robert Cumming, 
 Colin Dann, 
 Karel Eykman, 
 Hadley Irwin, 
 Henk van Kerkwijk, 
 E.L. Konigsburg, 
 Tomie de Paola, 
 Susan Sallis, 
 Ivan Southall, 
 Gabrielle Vincent,

1984 

 Nina Bawden, 
 Malcolm Bosse, 
 Hans Dorrestijn, 
 Willi Fährmann, 
 Evert van Ginkel, 
 Shirley Hughes, 
 Mansfield Kirby, 
 Irina Korschunow, 
 Margaret Mahy, 
 Selma Noort, 
 Svend Otto, 
 Marilyn Sachs, 
 Alet Schouten, 
 Renate Welsh, 
 Barbara Willard, 
 Willem Wilmink,

1985 

 Betsy Byars, 
 Roald Dahl, 
 Guus Kuijer, 
 Liesbeth van Lennep, 
 Noni Lichtveld, 
 Arnold Lobel, 
 Ron Maris, 
 Piet Meeuwissen, 
 Christine Nöstlinger, 
 Selma Noort, 
 Helen Oxenbury, 
 Fetze Pijlman, 
 Käthe Recheis, 
 Ouida Sebestyen, 
 Shel Silverstein, 
 Craig Strete, 
 Susan Varley, 
 Barbara Willard, 
 Willem Wilmink,

1986 

 Peter Carter, 
 Aidan Chambers, 
 Miep Diekmann, 
 Werner l´Egli, 
 Karel Eykman, 
 Rudolf Frank, 
 Ann O´Neal García, 
 Christoph Hein, 
 Wim Hofman, 
 Hadley Irwin, 
 Margaret Mahy, 
 Els Pelgrom, 
 Rukshana Smith, 
 Cynthia Voigt,

1987 

 Roald Dahl, 
 Midas Dekkers, 
 Miep Diekmann, 
 Miep Diekmann, 
 Gerben Hellinga jr., 
 Diet Huber, 
 
 Rindert Kromhout, 
 Guus Kuijer, 
 Joke van Leeuwen, 
 Ted van Lieshout, 
 Hanna Muschg, 
 Els Pelgrom, 
 William Steig, 
 Cynthia Voigt,

1988 

 Janet and Allan Ahlberg, 
 Christina Björk and Lena Anderson, 
 Eric Dederen and Philippe Moins, 
 Peter Dickinson, 
 Wim Hofman, 
 Wiel Kusters, 
 Joke van Leeuwen, 
 David MacKee, 
 Pauline Mol, 
 Michael Morpurgo, 
 Rita Törnqvist, 
 Willem Wilmink, 
 Laurence Yep,

1989 

 Ienne Biemans, 
 Gerard Brands, 
 Corinne Courtalon, 
 Roald Dahl, 
 Peter van Gestel, 
 Markus Kappeler, 
 Jetty Krever, 
 Sjoerd Kuyper, 
 Ted van Lieshout, 
 David McDowall, 
 Catherine Storr, 
 Henri Van Daele, 
 Akky van der Veer, 
 Max Velthuijs, 
 Dolf Verroen, 
 Martin Waddell,

1990 

 Tonke Dragt, 
 Wim Hofman, 
 David MacKee, 
 Jan Mark, 
 Jacques Musset, 
 Hiawyn Oram, 
 Uri Orlev, 
 Harriët van Reek, 
 Lydia Rood, 
 Billi Rosen, 
 Michael Rosen, 
 Gitte Spee, 
 Ruth Thomas, 
 Ida Vos,

1991 

 Burny Bos, 
 Anthony Browne, Anthony, 
 Xavier Hernandez and Pilar Comes, 
 Guus Kuijer, 
 Ted van Lieshout, 
 Laurence Mound, 
 Beverley Naidoo, 
 Max Velthuijs,

1992 

 Hans Hagen, 
 Martin Waddell, 
 Kit Pearson, 
 Toon Tellegen, 
 Libby Hathorn, 
 Rudolf Herfurtner, 
 Henri Van Daele, 
 Sylvie Girardet, Claire Merleau-Ponty, Anne Tardy and Fernando Puig Rosado, 
 Lannoo / Bosch & Keuning, 
 Lars Klinting,

1993 

 Camilla Ashforth, 
 Imme Dros, 
 Henri Van Daele, 
 Bart Moeyaert, 
 Mensje van Keulen, 
 Joke van Leeuwen, 
 Patricia MacLachlan, 
 Paula Fox, 
 Hans Hagen, 
 Hazel Rochman, 
 Midas Dekkers, 
 Lars Klinting, 
 Jacques Vos,

1994 

 Patsy Backx, 
 Ted van Lieshout, 
 Ulf Stark, 
 Kit Pearson, 
 Roberto Piumini, 
 Peter Pohl,

1995 

 Peter van Gestel, 
 Peter van Gestel, 
 Hans Hagen, 
 John Marsden, 
 Hushang Moradi-Kermani, 
 Roberto Piumini, 
 Rita Verschuur,

1996 

 Kees Jan Bender and Hans Heesen, 
 Janneke Derwig, 
 Chris Donner, 
 Imme Dros, 
 Rindert Kromhout, 
 Johanna Kruit, 
 Ben Kuipers, 
 Selma Noort, 
 Babette van Ogtrop and Liesbet Ruben, 
 Anton Quintana, 
 Max Velthuijs, 
 Cynthia Voigt,

1997 

 Kitty Crowther, 
 Berry van Gerwen, 
 Hakim Traïdia, 
 Elke Heidenreich, 
 Hilary McKay, 
 Jan Michael, 
 Rafik Schami, 
 Thomas Tidholm,

1998 

 Klaas van Assen, 
 Helena Dahlbåck, 
 Jaak Dreesen, 
 Kamagurka, 
 Ditte Merle, 
 Laura Ranger, 
 Kazumi Yumoto,

1999 

 Arno van Berge Henegouwen and Ruud Hisgen, 
 Rotraut Susanne Berner, 
 Sylvia vanden Heede, 
 Harm de Jonge,

2000 

 Daniil Charms, 
 Marie Delafon, 
 Wim Köhler, 
 Ditte Merle, 
 Mirjam Oldenhave, 
 Daan Remmerts de Vries,

2001 

 Carli Biessels, 
 J. Hohler, 
 Agave Kruijssen, 
 Ben Kuipers, 
 Hermine Landvreugd, 
 Bette Westera,

2002 

 Lida Dijkstra, 
 Bas Haring, 
 Harm de Jonge, 
 Tjibbe Veldkamp,

2003 

 Geert De Kockere, 
 Koos Meinderts, 
 Bette Westera,

2004 

 Jaak Dreesen, 
 Ed Franck, 
 Mireille Geus, 
 Ben Kuipers, 
 Peter H. Reynolds, 
 Jan Paul Schutten, 
 Annejoke Smids, 
 Edward van de Vendel, 
 Rik Zaal,

2005 

 Michael Rosen, 
 Lieneke Dijkzeul, 
 Riet Wille, 
 An van ´t Oosten,

2006 

 Bette Westera, 
 Saskia van der Wiel, 
 Andreas Steinhöfel, 
 Hilde Vandermeeren, 
 Dirk Weber, 
 Jet Bakels en Anne-Marie Boer,

2007 

 Carl Norac, 
 Carli Biessels, 
 Martha Heesen, 
 Rob Ruggenberg, 
 Harm de Jonge, 
 Tjibbe Veldkamp, 
 Piet Duizer,

2008 

 Mireille Geus, 
 Truus Matti, 
 Janny van der Molen, 
 Gideon Samson, 
 Edward van de Vendel,

2009 

 Koen van Biessen, 
 Ulrich Hub, 
 Christopher Grey, 
 Daan Remmerts de Vries, 
 Tanneke Wigersma,

2010 

 Nadine Brun-Cosme, 
 Sharon Creech, 
 Diverse auteurs, 
 Christian Duda, 
 Christopher Paul Curtis, 
 Sylvia Vanden Heede, 
 Margriet Heymans, 
 Rindert Kromhout, 
 Agnès de Lestrade, 
 Ted van Lieshout, 
 Chris Priestley, 
 Shaun Tan, 
 Edward van de Vendel,

2011 

 Ceciel de Bie, 
 Michael de Cock, 
 Siobhan Dowd, 
 Joke van Leeuwen, 
 Joke van Leeuwen, 
 Tine Mortier, 
 Mirjam Oldenhave, 
 Maria Parr, 
 Gustavo Roldán, 
 Edward van de Vendel, 
 Kaat Vrancken,

2012 

 Jenny Valentine, 
 Nadia Shireen, 
 Joke van Leeuwen, 
 Mathilde Stein, 
 Mirjam Oldenhave, 
 Marjolijn Hof, 
 Rob Ruggenberg, 
 Jowi Schmitz, 
 Lida Dijkstra, 
 Jan Paul Schutten, 
 Ted van Lieshout, 
 Various authors,

2013 

 Ienne Biemans and Ceseli Josephus Jitta, 
 Koen Van Biesen, 
 Cornelia Funke, 
 Hans Hagen and Philip Hopman, 
 Marco Kunst, 
 Jaap Robben and Benjamin Leroy, 
 Hilde Vandermeeren and Harmen van Straaten, 
 Bette Westera and Sylvia Weve, 
 Bette Westera, Naomi Tieman and Sylvia Weve, 
 Suzanne Wouda,

2014 

 Joukje Akveld and Annemarie Terhell, 
 Komako Sakai, 
 Ted van Lieshout, illustrated by Philip Hopman, 
 Marije van der Hoeven, 
 Edward van de Vendel, illustrated by Wolf Erlbruch, 
 Harm de Jonge, illustrated by Martijn van der Linden, 
 Ellen van Velzen, 
 Anna Woltz, 
 Mathilde Stein, 
 Marjolijn Hof, 
 Enne Koens, illustrated by Kees de Boer, 
 Marco Kunst, illustrated by Philip Hopman,

2015 

 Sjoerd Kuyper, illustrated by Sanne te Loo, 
 Michelle Robinson, illustrated by Kate Hindley, 
 Sylvia Vanden Heede and Inge Bergh, illustrated by Marije Tolman, 
 David Almond, illustrated by Oliver Jeffers, 
 Bette Westera, illustrated by Thé Tjong-Khing, 
 Rebecca Stevens, 
 Gerda Dendooven,

2016 

 Mac Barnett, illustrated by Jon Klassen, 
 Pieter Koolwijk, illustrated by Linde Faas, 
 Jenni Desmond, 
 B. J. Novak, 
 Bette Westera, illustrated by Klaas Verplancke, 
 Marieke Smithuis, illustrated by Annet Schaap, 
 Marc ter Horst, 
 Simon van der Geest, 
 Jessie Hartland, 
 Derk Visser, 
 Jennifer L. Holm, 
 Guido van Genechten, 
 Selma Noort, illustrated by Martijn van der Linden,

2017 

 Gideon Samson, 
 Edward van de Vendel, illustrated by Floor de Goede, 
 Anke Kranendonk, 
 Elle van Lieshout and Erik van Os, illustrated by Marije Tolman, 
 Marc ter Horst, illustrated by Eliane Gerrits, 
 Eoin Colfer, 
 Susie Hodge, illustrated by Claire Goble, 
 Hans Hagen, illustrated by Martijn van der Linden,

2018 

 Gideon Samson, illustrated by Annemarie van Haeringen, 
 Elena Favilli and Francesca Cavallo, 
 Daan Remmerts de Vries, illustrated by Floor Rieder, 
 Bette Westera, Koos Meinderts, Sjoerd Kuyper, Hans Hagen, Monique Hagen, illustrated by Mies van Hout, 
 Niki Padidar, 
 Lucy Strange, 
 Leslie Connor, 
 Lisa Thompson, 
 Bibi Dumon Tak, 
 Jef Aerts, illustrated by Sanne te Loo, 
 Stefan Boonen, illustrated by Jan van Lierde, 
 Marc ter Horst, 
 Anna Woltz, illustrated by Annet Schaap,

2019 

 Mark Haayema, 
 Hadi Mohammadi, 
 Louise Greig, 
 Janneke Schotveld, 
 Koos Meinderts, 
 Ulf Stark, 
 Marjolijn Hof, 
 Davide Morosinotto, 
 Jessica Townsend, 
 Mark Lowery, 
 Katherine Marsh, 
 Marloes Morshuis, 
 Marc ter Horst, 
 Arend van Dam, 
 Floor Bal, 
 Kees Spiering, 
 Hans Hagen,

Illustrations 

The Vlag en Wimpel award can be given by the jury the Gouden Penseel and Zilveren Penseel awards.

1980 

 Bert Bouman and Karel Eykman, 
 Mance Post,

1981 

 John Burningham, 
 Etienne Delessert, 
 Michael Foreman, 
 Lio Fromm, 
 Tatjana Hauptmann, 
 Annemie Heymans, 
 Janosch, 
 Jef Koning, 
 Arnold Lobel, 
 Ingrid Schubert and Dieter Schubert, 
 Thé Tjong-Khing, 
 Fiep Westendorp,

1982 

 Jean Dulieu, 
 Philippe Dumas, 
 Russell Hoban and Quentin Blake, 
 Helen Oxenbury, 
 Michael Rosen and Quentin Blake, 
 Ingrid Schubert and Dieter Schubert, 
 Maurice Sendak, 
 Peter Spier,

1983 

 Quentin Blake, 
 Jean Dulieu, 
 Helme Heine, 
 Annemie Heymans and Margriet Heymans, 
 Arnold Lobel, 
 Dieter Schubert, 
 Thé Tjong-Khing, 
 Sylvia Weve,

1984 

 Jean Dulieu, 
 Helme Heine, 
 Theo Olthuis, 
 Mance Post, 
 Lidia Postma, 
 Ingrid Schubert and Dieter Schubert,

1985 

 Quentin Blake, 
 Raymond Briggs, 
 Arnold Lobel, 
 Tony Ross, 
 Tony Ross, 
 Thé Tjong-Khing, 
 Thé Tjong-Khing,

1986 

 Rotraut Susanne Berner, 
 Michael Foreman, 
 Janosch, 
 Arnold Lobel, 
 Gisela Neumann, 
 Tony Ross, 
 Joost Swarte, 
 Max Velthuijs,

1987 

 Käthi Bhend, 
 Quentin Blake, 
 Quentin Blake, 
 Harriët van Reek,

1988 

 Hans de Beer, 
 Posy Simmonds, 
 Gabrielle Vincent,

1989 

 Anna Höglund, 
 Joke van Leeuwen, 
 Angela de Vrede,

1990 

 Tony Ross, 
 Max Velthuijs, 
 Sylvia Weve,

1991 

 Gerard Berends, 
 Geerten Ten Bosch, 
 Harrie Geelen,

1992 

 Annemie Heymans, and Margriet Heymans, 
 Anna Höglund, 
 Wim Hofman,

1993 

 David MacKee, 
 Tony Ross, 
 Ralph Steadman,

1994 

 Patsy Backx, 
 Lucy Cousins, 
 Stephen Biesty,

1995 

 Annemarie van Haeringen, 
 Philip Hopman, 
 Marit Törnqvist,

1996 

 Quentin Blake, 
 Emma Chichester Clark, 
 Jaap de Vries,

1997 

 Wolf Erlbruch, 
 Daan Remmerts de Vries,

1998 

 Gerda Dendooven, 
 Johanna Kang, 
 Sylvia Weve,

1999 

 Rotraut Susanne Berner, 
 Marijke ten Cate, 
 Thé Tjong-Khing,

2000 

 Norman Junge, 
 Ceseli Josephus Jitta,

2001 

 Hans de Beer, 
 Ian Falconer, 
 Ingrid Godon,

2002 

 Jutta Brouwer, 
 Bertand Dubois, 
 Sieb Posthuma,

2003 

 Goele Dewanckel, 
 Klaas Verplancke,

2004 

 Gerda Dendooven, 
 Sebastiaan Van Doninck, 
 Fleur van der Weel,

2005 

 Sieb Posthuma, 
 Rotraut Susanne Berner, 
 Wolf Erlbruch,

2006 

 Natali Fortier, 
 Yvonne Jagtenberg, 
 Isabelle Vandenabeele,

2007 

 Ceseli Josephus Jitta, 
 Patrick McDonnell, 
 Sylvia Weve,

2008 

 Wolf Erlbruch, 
 Audrey Poussier, 
 Marije Tolman,

2009 

 Sebastiaan van Doninck, 
 Nathalie Faber and Matthijs Immink, 
 Piet Grobler, 
 Shaun Tan, 
 Catharina Valckx, 
 Fiel van der Veen,

2010 

 Philip Hopman, 
 Sieb Posthuma, 
 Loes Riphagen,

2011 

 Various illustrators, 
 Tjalling Houkema, 
 Wendy Panders,

2012 

 Annemarie van Haeringen, 
 Wouter van Reek, 
 Mathilde Stein,

2013 

 Frédérique Bertrand, 
 Koen Van Biesen, 
 Mies van Hout,

2014 

 Imme Dros, 
 Henriëtte Boerendans, 
 Xavier Deneux,

2015 

 Sylvia Weve, 
 Cruschiform, 
 Adrienne Barman,

2016 

 Various illustrators, 
 Merlijne Marell, 
 Martijn van der Linden, written by Edward van de Vendel,

2017 

 Kitty Crowther, 
 Terry Fan, 
 Yoko Heiligers,

2018 

 Enzo Pérès-Labourdette, written by Wouter Klootwijk, 
 Arie van 't Riet, written by Jan Paul Schutten, 
 Mark Janssen, 
 Jon Klassen, written by Mac Barnett, 
 Joost Swarte, 
 Øyvind Torseter, 
 Kitty Crowther, 
 Martijn van der Linden, written by Joukje Akveld, 
 Marije Tolman, written by Daan Remmerts de Vries, 
 Coralie Bickford-Smith, 
 Medy Oberendorff, written by Bart Rossel,

References

External links 
 Collectieve Propaganda van het Nederlandse Boek (in Dutch)

Children's literary awards
Dutch children's literature
Dutch literary awards
Awards established in 1980
1980 establishments in the Netherlands